The City of Randwick is a local government area in the Eastern Suburbs of Sydney, New South Wales, Australia. Established in 1859, Randwick is the second-oldest local government area in New South Wales, after the City of Sydney.

The Mayor of the City of Randwick is Cr. Dylan Parker, a member of NSW Labor, who was first elected on 30 September 2021.

Suburbs and localities in the local government area 
Suburbs and localities in the City of Randwick are:

These localities are also serviced by Randwick Council:

History 
Indigenous Australian history in the area dates back tens of thousands of years. The local people at the time of colonisation were the Cadigal of the Dharug language group. European settlement led to the deaths of many Cadigal via introduced diseases or in conflict with settlers. The surviving Cadigal left the area or were pushed to the fringes of settlement. By the mid-nineteenth century, the original tribal groupings had been effectively destroyed.

The name Randwick comes from the village of Randwick in Gloucestershire, England, birthplace of the district's first mayor Simeon Henry Pearce. The area was home to a few wealthy landowners and the poor residents of several shantytowns until the 1880s, when the coming of trams from Sydney brought extensive suburban development. This development continued steadily, with new tram lines (long since demolished) opening up most of the city for subdivision by the early 1900s. The New South Wales University of Technology opened at Kensington in 1949 on the site of Kensington Racecourse, eventually becoming the University of New South Wales.

Following an independent review, in May 2016 the NSW Government sought to dismiss the Council and force its amalgamation with Woollahra and Waverley councils. Woollahra Council instigated legal action claiming that there was procedural unfairness and that a KPMG report at the centre of merger proposals had been "misleading". The matter was heard before the NSW Court of Appeal who, in December 2016, unanimously dismissed Woollahra Council's appeal, finding no merit in its arguments that the proposed merger with Waverley and Randwick councils was invalid. In July 2017, the Berejiklian government decided to abandon the forced merger of the Woollahra, Waverley and Randwick local government areas, along with several other proposed forced mergers.

Town Clerks and General Managers

Demographics
Aboriginal and Torres Strait Islander people made up 1.5% of the population; significantly below the NSW and Australian averages of 2.9 and 2.8 per cent respectively. The median age of people in the City of Randwick was 34 years. Children aged 0–14 years made up 14.9% of the population and people aged 65 years and over made up 13.4% of the population. Of people in the area aged 15 years and over, 38.5% were married and 9.1% were either divorced or separated.

When compared with total population growth of Australia for the same periods, being 5.78% and 8.32% respectively, population growth in Randwick local government area was lower than the national average. The median weekly income for residents within the City of Randwick was higher than the national average.

Council

Current composition and election method
Randwick City Council is composed of fifteen Councillors elected proportionally as five separate wards, each electing three Councillors. All Councillors are elected for a fixed four-year term of office. The Mayor is elected for a two-year term, with the Deputy Mayor for one year, by the Councillors at the first meeting of the Council. The most recent election was held on 4 December 2021, and the makeup of the Council is as follows:

The current Council, elected in 2021, in order of election by ward, is:

Heritage listings
The City of Randwick has a number of heritage-listed sites, including those listed under the New South Wales Heritage Register:
 Centennial Park, 3R Oxford Street: Centennial Park Reservoir
 Centennial Park, 5R Oxford Street: Woollahra Reservoir
 Coogee, 45-51 Beach Street: Cliffbrook
 Coogee, Grant Reserve: McIver Women's Baths
 Coogee, 4b Neptune Street: Wylie's Baths
 Kensington, 85 Todman Avenue: Carthona (Kensington)
 La Perouse, Bare Island Fort
 La Perouse, 46 Adina Avenue: La Perouse Mission Church
 La Perouse, 1-39 Bunnerong Road: Chinese Market Gardens (La Perouse)
 Little Bay, 1430 Anzac Parade: Prince Henry Site
 Malabar, 1250 Anzac Parade: Long Bay Correctional Centre
 Malabar, Franklin Street: Malabar Headland
 Randwick, Centennial Park, Moore Park, Queens Park
 Randwick, 124 Alison Road: Randwick Post Office
 Randwick, 162 Alison Road: Randwick Presbyterian Church
 Randwick, 102-108 Avoca Street: St Jude's Church, Randwick
 Randwick, 211-215 Avoca Street: Corana and Hygeia
 Randwick, 128 Belmore Road: Sandgate (Randwick)
 Randwick, 60 Bundock Lane: Electricity Substation No. 341
 Randwick, 66 Frenchmans Road: Venice (Randwick)
 Randwick, 17 Gilderthorpe Avenue: Hooper Cottage
 Randwick, 16-18 Milford Street: Nugal Hall
 Randwick, 2S Frances Street: Electricity Substation No. 349
 Randwick, 43 St Marks Road: Rathven (Randwick)
 Randwick, 43 St Pauls Street: Ritz Cinema, Sydney
 Randwick, 18-20 Stanley Street: Emanuel School, Australia
 Randwick, 26-42 The Avenue: Avonmore Terrace
 Randwick, 29-39 Young Street: Big Stable Newmarket

Future 
The new Kensington to Kingsford Planning Strategy by the City of Randwick will include 8 new plazas, more than a doubling of public space, and wider footpaths along the Anzac Parade. The general height controls along the Parade will increase to 31 metres, while the key intersections with Todman Avenue Strachan Street, and Nine-ways roundabout will be 57-60 metres. It will also require 5% affordable housing of new residential developments and a requirement that active street frontages are used for commercial activities.

References

External links

 Randwick City Council website
 Randwick City Tourism

 
Botany Bay
1859 establishments in Australia
Randwick